Western Province is the largest of the nine provinces of Solomon Islands. The area is renowned for its beautiful tropical islands, excellent diving and snorkelling, coral reefs and World War II wrecks, ecotourism lodges, and head-hunting shrines. The province contains many small lagoons and most of the country's tourist trade outside Honiara.

History
The Methodist Mission in the Western Province was established by Rev. John Francis Goldie in 1902.  He dominated the mission and gained the loyalty of Solomon Islander members of his church. The relationship with the colonial administrators of the  British Solomon Island Protectorate were also fraught with difficulty, at this time due to Goldie's effective control over the Western Solomon Islands. From 1927 to 1934 Dr Edward Sayers worked at the Methodist mission where he established a hospital at Gizo, and also at Munda and Vella Lavella, and carried out fieldwork in the treatment of malaria. It is also renowned as where the American Navy ship commanded by John F. Kennedy was bombed and sunk by the Japanese during the Second World War.

Tourism

The provincial capital is Gizo, with a population of 7,177 (as of the 2009 Census), and the second largest town in the country. There are airports at Gizo, Munda, Seghe, Viru, Ramata, Gatokae, Ringgi Cove, Barakoma & Balalai.

The Western Province is considered the tourism mecca of the Solomon Islands, and is by far the most accommodating area, with multiple hotels and resorts, dive shops, ecotourism attractions restaurants, and boat tours.

Munda, the largest town on New Georgia island, has a landing strip built during World War II by the US and is listed as an emergency landing runway, capable of handling even jumbo jets.

The diving in the Western Province is pristine as tourists tend to visit nearby Fiji for diving rather than visiting the less developed Solomon Islands.  Also, malaria is a concern in the Solomons, which keeps many tourists away.  The result is spectacular dive conditions with untouched coral reefs. Munda, Uepi, and Gizo are considered some of the Western Province's best dive locations. The region supports some of the highest coral and fish diversity in the world.

The Western Province and nearby Choiseul Province were significantly affected by 2007 Solomon Islands earthquake, an 8.1 magnitude earthquake that struck on April 2, 2007 and an associated tsunami. It caused 100+ significant (in excess of magnitude 4.0) aftershocks.  The official death toll was 52 with several thousand persons displaced, most of the displaced are expected to be living in temporary shelters for a minimum of between 6 and 9 months.  The island of Ranongga to the west of Gizo was uplifted by around 2.5 – 3 metres resulting in the death of its fringing reef and also opening massive fissures in the island itself.  Reefs around Munda and Uepi were largely unaffected by the tsunami and earthquake.

Administrative divisions
Western Province is sub-divided into the following wards, listed with their populations at the 2009 Census:

 Western Province (76,649)
Outer Shortlands (1,306)
Inner Shortlands (2,397)
Simbo (1,782)
North Ranongga (541)
Central Ranongga (2,514)
South Ranongga (3,305)
Vonunu (3,558)
Mbilua (4,290)
Ndovele (1,967)
Irringgilla (2,833)
Gizo (7,177)
South Kolombangara (4,023)
Vonavona (5,515)
Kusaghe (2,238)
Munda (2,620)
Nusa Roviana (1,995)
Roviana Lagoon (4,675)
South Rendova (2,477)
North Rendova (1,724)
Kolombaghea (1,783)
Mbuini Tusu (2,965)
Nono (3,610)
Nggatokae (3,050)
North Vangunu (2,661)
Noro (3,365)
North Kolombangara (2,278)

Islands
Akara Island
Faisi
Fauro Island
Gizo 
Ghoi
Kennedy Island
Kiambe
Kingguru
Kohinggo
Kolombangara
Liapari
Logha
Lola Island
Marovo Island
Marovo Lagoon
Matikuri
Mbava
Mborokua
Mbulo Island
Mondomondo
Mono Island
Nakaza
New Georgia
Nggatokae
Nusatupe
Ranongga
Rendova
Shortland Island
Simbo
Stirling Island
Telina
Tetepare
Uepi
Vella Lavella
Vangunu
Vonavona

References

External links
 Provincial Profile of the West, People First Network 
 Western photo gallery from Ministry of Commerce and Tourism
 Digital Photo Library of the West from the People First Network 
 Bekabeka distance learning centre, Gatokae
 Marovo Learning Network

 
Provinces of the Solomon Islands